Mammoth Spring School District is a school district in Mammoth Spring, Fulton County, Arkansas, United States.

History 
On July 1, 2010, the Twin Rivers School District was dissolved. A portion of the district was given to the Mammoth Spring district.

Schools 
 Mammoth Spring High School, serving grades 7 through 12.
 Mammoth Spring Elementary School, serving prekindergarten through grade 6.

References

Further reading
Maps of the predecessor districts:
  (Download)
  (Download)

External links
 

Education in Fulton County, Arkansas
Education in Sharp County, Arkansas
School districts in Arkansas